The major facilitator superfamily (MFS) is a superfamily of membrane transport proteins that facilitate movement of small solutes across cell membranes in response to chemiosmotic gradients.

Function 
The major facilitator superfamily (MFS) are membrane proteins which are expressed ubiquitously in all kingdoms of life for the import or export of target substrates. The MFS family was originally believed to function primarily in the uptake of sugars but subsequent studies revealed that drugs, metabolites, oligosaccharides, amino acids and oxyanions were all transported by MFS family members. These protein energetically drive transport utilizing the electrochemical gradient of the target substrate (uniporter), or act as a cotransporter where transport is coupled to the movement of a second substrate.

Fold

The basic fold of the MFS transporter is built around 12, or in some cases, 14 transmembrane helices (TMH), with two 6- (or 7- ) helix bundles formed by the N and C terminal homologous domains of the transporter which are connected by an extended cytoplasmic loop. The two halves of the protein pack against each other in a clam-shell fashion, sealing via interactions at the ends of the transmembrane helices and extracellular loops. This forms a large aqueous cavity at the center of the membrane, which is alternatively open to the cytoplasm or periplasm/extracellular space. Lining this aqueous cavity are the amino-acids which bind the substrates and define transporter specificity. Many MFS transporters are thought to be dimers through in vitro and in vivo methods, with some evidence to suggest a functional role for this oligomerization.

Mechanism

The alternating-access mechanism thought to underlie the transport of most MFS transport is classically described as the "rocker-switch" mechanism. In this model, the transporter opens to either the extracellular space or cytoplasm and simultaneously seals the opposing face of the transporter, preventing a continuous pathway across the membrane. For example, in the best studied MFS transporter, LacY, lactose and protons typically bind from the periplasm to specific sites within the aqueous cleft. This drives closure of the extracellular face, and opening of the cytoplasmic side, allowing substrate into the cell. Upon substrate release, the transporter recycles to the periplasmic facing orientation.

Exporters and antiporters of the MFS family follow a similar reaction cycle, though exporters bind substrate in the cytoplasm and extrude it to the extracellular or periplasmic space, while antiporters bind substrate in both states to drive each conformational change.  While most MFS structures suggest large, rigid body structural changes with substrate binding, the movements may be small in the cases of small substrates, such as the nitrate transporter NarK.

Transport 
The generalized transport reactions catalyzed by MFS porters are:

 Uniport: S (out) ⇌ S (in)
 Symport: S (out) + [H+ or Na+] (out) ⇌ S (in) + [H+ or Na+] (in)
 Antiport: S1 (out) + S2 (in) ⇌ S1 (in) + S2 (out) (S1 may be H+ or a solute)

Substrate specificity 

Though initially identified as sugar transporters, a function conserved from prokaryotes to mammals, the MFS family is notable for the great diversity of substrates transported by the superfamily. These range from small oxyanions to large peptide fragments. Other MFS transporters are notable for a lack of selectivity, extruding broad classes of drugs and xenobiotics. This substrate specificity is largely determined by specific side chains which line the aqueous pocket at the center of the membrane. While one substrate of particular biological importance is often used to name the transporter or family, there may also be co-transported or leaked ions or molecules. These include water molecules or the coupling ions which energetically drive transport.

Structures

The crystal structures of a number of MFS transporters have been characterized. The first structures were of the glycerol 3-phosphate/phosphate exchanger GlpT  and the lactose-proton symporter LacY, which served to elucidate the overall structure of the protein family and provided initial models for understanding the MFS transport mechanism. Since these initial structures other MFS structures have been solved which illustrate substrate specificity or states within the reaction cycle. While the initial MFS structures solved were of bacterial transporters, recently structures of the first eukaryotic structures have been published. These include a fungal phosphate transporter PiPT, plant nitrate transporter NRT1.1, and the human glucose transporter GLUT1.

Evolution

The origin of the basic MFS transporter fold is currently under heavy debate. All currently recognized MFS permeases have the two six-TMH domains within a single polypeptide chain, although in some MFS families an additional two TMHs are present. Evidence suggests that the MFS permeases arose by a tandem intragenic duplication event in the early prokaryotes. This event generated the 12 transmembrane helix topology from a (presumed) primordial 6-helix dimer.  Moreover, the well-conserved MFS specific motif between TMS2 and TMS3 and the related but less well conserved motif between TMS8 and TMS9 prove to be a characteristic of virtually all of the more than 300 MFS proteins identified. However, the origin of the primordial 6-helix domain is under heavy debate. While some functional and structural evidence suggests that this domain arose out of a simpler 3-helix domain, bioinformatic or phylogenetic evidence supporting this hypothesis is lacking.

Medical significance

MFS family members are central to human physiology and play an important role in a number of diseases, through aberrant action, drug transport, or drug resistance. The OAT1 transporter transports a number of nucleoside analogs central to antiviral therapy. Resistance to antibiotics is frequently the result of action of MFS resistance genes. Mutations in MFS transporters have also been found to be cause neurodegerative disease, vascular disorders of the brain, and glucose storage diseases.

Disease mutations
Disease associated mutations have been found in a number of human MFS transporters; those annotated in Uniprot are listed below.

Human MFS proteins 
There are several MFS proteins in humans, where they are known as solute carriers (SLCs) and Atypical SLCs. There are today 52 SLC families, of which 16 families include MFS proteins; SLC2, 15 16, 17, 18, 19, SLCO (SLC21), 22, 29, 33, 37, 40, 43, 45, 46 and 49. Atypical SLCs are MFS proteins, sharing sequence similarities and evolutionary origin with SLCs, but they are not named according to the SLC root system, which originates from the hugo gene nomenclature system (HGNC). All atypical SLCs are listed in detail in, but they are: MFSD1, MFSD2A, MFSD2B, MFSD3, MFSD4A, MFSD4B, MFSD5, MFSD6, MFSD6L, MFSD8, MFSD9, MFSD10, MFSD11, MFSD12, MFSD13A, MFSD14A, MFSD14B, UNC93A, UNC93B1, SV2A, SV2B, SV2C, SVOP, SVOPL, SPNS1, SPNS2, SPNS3 and CLN3. As there is high sequence identity and phylogenetic resemblance between the atypical SLCs of MFS type, they can be divided into 15 AMTFs (Atypical MFS Transporter Families), suggesting there are at least 64 different families including SLC proteins of MFS type.

References 

Protein domains
Transmembrane proteins
Articles containing video clips
Protein superfamilies
Transport proteins